Upendra Kaul is an Indian cardiologist and one of the pioneers of interventional cardiology in India. He is the Chairman and Dean Academics and Research at the Batra Hospital and Medical Research Center. He is known for his expertise in procedures such as Percutaneous Cardiopulmonary bypass, Rotational and Directional Atherectomy, Coronary stenting and Percutaneous Laser Myocardial Revascularization. He graduated in medicine (MBBS) from the Maulana Azad Medical College and continued his studies at the same institution to secure MD in 1975 and, DM in cardiology in 1978. Later, he obtained advanced training in interventional cardiology from Australia during 1983 to 84. He has served the All India Institute of Medical Sciences (AIIMS) as a professor of cardiology and has been a member of the faculty of the Post Graduate Institute of Medical Education and Research, G. B. Pant Hospital, Batra Hospital and Fortis Health Care, NCR. and Executive Director and Dean at Fortis Health Care, New Delhi.

Kaul is a former president of the Cardiological Society of India and the SAARC Cardiac Society and is a Fellow of the American College of Cardiology and the National Academy of Medical Sciences (NAMS). He has published over 450 medical papers and has won the Medtronic Award for the Best Scientific Paper in 1983. He received the highest Indian award in the medical category, Dr. B. C. Roy Award, in 1999. The Government of India awarded him the fourth highest civilian honour of the Padma Shri, in 2006, for his contributions to Indian medicine. He is also a recipient of the Dr. Thapar Gold Medal in 1970, Searle Award of the Cardiological Society of India in 1986, Shakuntala Amirchand Prize of the Indian Council of Medical Research in 1987, Press India Award in 1992.

In 2019, he was summoned by the National Investigation Agency (NIA) after the NIA sleuths misread his use of medical jargon to mean a hawala transaction. , Prof Kaul started an NGO Gauri Kaul Foundation (registered with the Ministry of Corporate Affairs (MCA), bearing DIN 09139657) in April 2021. The foundation has set up 3 centres in Jammu and Kashmir, Machil, near LOC, District Kupwara, Jagti Migrant township near Nagrota Jammu and in his place of birth Hawal, Pulwama. Indian Oil Corporation (IOC) and Oil and Natural Gas Corporation (ONGC) and Astra Zeneca have generously helped through their CSR. Currently their mission is "No Heart attack" by spreading measures to be taken by the public at large by organizing public awareness programs. Prof Kaul has written his memoirs "When The Heart Speaks" published by Konark publishing house in September 2022.

See also 
 Atherectomy
 Cardiopulmonary bypass
 Coronary stenting
 Revascularization

References

External links 
 

Recipients of the Padma Shri in medicine
Year of birth missing (living people)
Indian cardiologists
Interventional cardiology
Indian medical writers
Indian medical academics
Dr. B. C. Roy Award winners
Maulana Azad College alumni
Academic staff of the All India Institute of Medical Sciences, New Delhi
Living people
20th-century Indian medical doctors
Fellows of the American College of Cardiology